The Costa Rican Renewal Party is a Christian political party in Costa Rica.

History
Established in 1995, as a splinter of the National Christian Alliance, the party first participated in national elections in 1998, when its presidential candidate, Sherman Thomas Jackson, received 1.4% of the vote, whilst they won a single seat in the parliamentary elections, taken by pastor and lawyer Justo Orozco. During the 1999–2000 popular protests against the electric liberalization bill known as Combo ICE, Orozco supported the protests and voted against the bill.

Orozco was the party's presidential candidate in 2002, finishing fifth with 1.1% of the vote. The party also retained its sole parliamentary seat in the elections, taken by Carlos Avendaño. However, Avendaño left the party and founded his own (National Restoration Party).

In the 2006 elections the party's candidate Bolívar Serrano Hidalgo won 3.4% of the vote in the presidential election, but the party lost its parliamentary seat (to Avendaño's party). Journalist David Romero Mora, well known for his book El caso Chemise, endorsed the party in this period.

During the 2007 Costa Rican Dominican Republic – Central America Free Trade Agreement referendum, it stood with the opposition to the agreement.

In 2010 elections, former Tibás mayor Mayra Gonzalez finished sixth in the presidential contest with 0.7%, but the party regained parliamentary representation, winning a solitary seat, taken by Orozco. Orozco was very polemic during his tenure especially because some of his public comments were accused of homophobia and because he was elected president of the Human Rights Commission of Parliament thanks to his alliance with then ruling PLN. Orozco was candidate again in 2014 gaining similar results (1% of the votes) yet obtaining 2 seats in Congress, took by Gonzalo Ramírez Zamora and Abelino Esquivel. One of them, Gonzalo Ramírez Zamora, was elected president of the Legislative Assembly for the 2017–2018 period, supported by the National Liberation Party branch.

During the mandatory party structures renovation process for the 2017–2018 election campaign, the party divided between Orozco supporters and critics. Orozco critics, led by both party congressmen at that moment, Gonzalo Ramírez and Abelino Esquivel, won the process, so Orozco and his supporters left the party, and did not join any other for that election. At the end, Ramírez tendency, considered pro-PLN, took control of the party, also excluding Esquivel's tendency from the party conduction and candidate lists. With both Orozco and Esquivel center-leftist tendencies out of the race, journalist Stephanie Campos was elected as presidential candidate and former liberacionista right-wing Congressman Daniel Gallardo Monge as its head of list. Finally, the party got very weak results and couldn't maintain any seat in Congress.

The party holds very conservative beliefs and is directed toward the evangelical Christian minority, opposing such subjects as abortion, same-sex marriage, marijuana legalization and violent video games.

See also
 Evangelical political parties in Latin America

References

1995 establishments in Costa Rica
Conservative parties in Costa Rica
Political parties established in 1995
Protestantism in Costa Rica
Protestant political parties
Social conservative parties